Tatsukawa (written: 達川 or 立川) is a Japanese surname. Notable people with the surname include:

, Japanese judoka
, Japanese volleyball player and coach
, Japanese baseball player

Japanese-language surnames